Orak Island, known in Greek as Drepano (Δρέπανο), is an uninhabited Aegean island in Turkey. Its ancient name was Drepano. It is a part of Tavşan Islands.
Administratively it is in Ezine ilçe (district) of Çanakkale Province.

References

Islands of Çanakkale Province
Uninhabited islands of Turkey
Aegean islands
Ezine District
Islands of Turkey